Brookfield railway station may refer to:

 Brookfield railway station (England), a closed station in Cumbria, England
 Brookfield station (Illinois), a station in the United States
 Brookfield station (Metro-North), a proposed station in Connecticut, USA
 Brookfield railway station (Nova Scotia), a closed station in Canada
 Brookfield railway station, Victoria, a closed station in Australia